"Let's Dance" is a 1987 single by British singer-songwriter Chris Rea. The song first appeared in an early form as a B-side to the "It's All Gone" single in 1986 and was re-recorded for his 1987 album, Dancing with Strangers, serving as its lead single. "Let's Dance" peaked at  12 on the UK Singles Chart and No. 81 on the US Billboard Hot 100. In New Zealand, it reached No. 2 for three non-consecutive weeks, and it also peaked within the top 10 in Australia, Ireland, and South Africa.

In 1988, it was re-recorded again for the New Light Through Old Windows album and this version is the most well known. Another version of the song was re-released with new lyrics in 1997 by Middlesbrough F.C., Rea's hometown football club, with the new lyrics provided by comedian Bob Mortimer.

Track listings

7-inch single
A. "Let's Dance" – 3:52
B. "I Don't Care Anymore" – 2:08

UK CD and cassette single
 "Let's Dance" – 3:52
 "Let's Dance" (12-inch special remix) – 6:04
 "Josephine" (extended French re-record) – 5:35
 "I Don't Care Anymore" – 2:08

UK 12-inch single
A1. "Let's Dance" (The Remix) – 7:02
B1. "Josephine" (extended French re-record) – 5:35
B2. "Let's Dance" (7-inch version) – 3:52
B3. "I Don't Care Anymore" – 2:08

Charts

Weekly charts

Year-end charts

References

1987 songs
1987 singles
1997 singles
Chris Rea songs
Magnet Records singles
Songs about dancing
Songs written by Chris Rea